The Kate Greenaway Medal is a British literary award that annually recognises "distinguished illustration in a book for children". It is conferred upon the illustrator by the Chartered Institute of Library and Information Professionals (CILIP) which inherited it from the Library Association.

The Medal is named after the 19th-century English illustrator of children's books Kate Greenaway (1846–1901). It was established in 1955 and inaugurated next year for 1955 publications, but no work was considered suitable. The first Medal was awarded in 1957 to Edward Ardizzone for Tim All Alone (Oxford, 1956), which he also wrote. That first Medal was dated 1956. Only since 2007 the Medal is dated by its presentation during the year following publication. The Greenaway is a companion to the Carnegie Medal which recognises one outstanding work of writing for children and young adults (conferred upon the author).

Nominated books must be first published in the U.K. during the preceding school year (September to August), with English-language text if any.

The award by CILIP is a gold Medal and £500 worth of books donated to the illustrator's chosen library. Since 2000 there is also a £5000 cash prize from a bequest by the children's book collector Colin Mears.

Rules
Library and information professionals (CILIP) nominate books in September and October, after the close of the publication year. A panel of 12 children's librarians in CILIP's youth interest group (YLG) judges both the Carnegie and Greenaway books.
Currently the shortlist is announced in March and the winner in June, between nine and 21 months after first U.K. publication.

Candidates must be published in the U.K. during the preceding year (September to August). They must be published for young people, and published in the U.K. originally or within three months in case of co-publication. English must be the language of any text, or one of dual languages.

"All categories of illustrated books for children and young people are eligible."

CILIP specifies numerous points of artistic style, format, and visual experience, and also "synergy of illustration and text" that should be considered "where applicable". Furthermore, "The whole work should provide pleasure from a stimulating and satisfying visual experience which leaves a lasting impression. Illustrated work needs to be considered primarily in terms of its graphic elements, and where text exists particular attention should be paid to the synergy between the two."

Winners 
Through 2021 there have been 65 Greenaway Medals awarded in 66 years, covering 1955 to 2020 publications approximately. No eligible book published in 1955 or 1958 was considered suitable.

From 2007 the medals are dated by the year of presentation; previously by the calendar year of British publication, which then defined the eligible works.

* named to the 50th Anniversary Top Ten in 2007.

Winners of multiple awards
Only one illustrator, Chris Riddell, has won three Greenaway Medals. Fourteen other illustrators have won two of the 64 Greenaway Medals awarded through 2021. The first winner of two Medals was John Burningham, 1963 and 1970. The most recent is Sydney Smith in 2018 and 2021.

Only A Monster Calls (Walker Books, 2011), by Patrick Ness and Jim Kay, has won both the Carnegie and Greenaway Medals for writing and illustration (2012).

In 2014, This Is Not My Hat by Jon Klassen won both the Greenaway Medal and the American Caldecott Medal, which recognises a picture book illustrated by a U.S. citizen or resident. This is the first time the same book has won both medals. The recently common practice of co-publication makes a double win possible. Indeed, This Is Not My Hat was released in Britain and America on the same day, 9 October 2012, by Walker Books and its American subsidiary Candlewick Press.

Gail E. Haley was the first illustrator to win both medals, albeit for different works: the 1971 Caldecott for A Story a Story (1970) and the 1976 Greenaway for The Post Office Cat. She also wrote both books.

Helen Oxenbury, who won the 1969 and 1999 medals, was also a "Highly Commended" runner-up four times from 1989 to 1994; the distinction was used 31 times in 29 years to 2002 and no other illustrator was highly commended more than twice.
Michael Foreman, who won the 1982 and 1989 medals, was highly commended once and four times a "Commended" runner-up, a distinction used 68 times in 44 years to 2002.

Walker Books, based in London, with American subsidiary Candlewick Press in Somerville, MA, has published 10 of the 30 Greenaway Medal-winning works from 1985 to 2014.

50-year Greenaway of Greenaways (2007)
For the 50th anniversary, CILIP posted online information about all of the winning works (1955–2005) and conducted a poll to identify the nation's favourite Kate Greenaway Medalist. The winner was announced 21 June 2007 at the British Library. By less than one percentage point Dogger, illustrated and written by Shirley Hughes (1977), outpolled Each Peach Pear Plum illustrated by Janet Ahlberg and written by Allan Ahlberg (1978).

The nation, and international voters too, considered a ballot or all-time shortlist comprising ten of the 53 Medal-winning works, selected by six "children's book experts". The panel provided annotations including recommended ages that range from 1+ to 10+ years; age 4+ for the winner.

50th Anniversary Top Ten
 Janet Ahlberg, Each Peach Pear Plum (Kestrel, 1978), written by Allan Ahlberg
 Edward Ardizzone, Tim All Alone (Oxford, 1956)
 Quentin Blake, Mr Magnolia (Jonathan Cape, 1980)
 Raymond Briggs, Father Christmas (Hamish Hamilton, 1973)
 Anthony Browne, Gorilla (Julia MacRae, 1983)
 John Burningham, Borka: The Adventures of a Goose With No Feathers (Jonathan Cape, 1963)
 Lauren Child, I Will Never Not Ever Eat a Tomato (Orchard, 2000)
 Shirley Hughes, Dogger (Bodley Head, 1977)
 Charles Keeping, The Highwayman (Oxford, 1981), an edition of the 1906 poem by Alfred Noyes
 Helen Oxenbury, Alice's Adventures in Wonderland (Walker, 1999), an edition of the 1865 novel by Lewis Carroll

Shortlists

Headings give the official award dates: years of publication before 2006; years of presentation after 2006.

1954 Carnegie Medal
Illustrator Harold Jones received a Special Commendation for the 1954 Carnegie Medal, for his part in Lavender's Blue: A Book of Nursery Rhymes, compiled by Kathleen Lines (Oxford) — a 180-page collection named for "Lavender's Blue", which Oxford University Press has reprinted many times.  It was "a major reason" for the Library Association to establish the Kate Greenaway Medal that year. No 1955 work was judged worthy in 1956, so the Greenaway was actually inaugurated one year later, recognising a 1956 publication.

1955 to 1994

Prior to 1995 these listings cover only the Medalist and known Highly Commended (+) or Commended (–) books.

1955 (no Medal)

1956 Edward Ardizzone, Tim All Alone (Oxford) @

Ardizzone had inaugurated the Tim series in 1936 with Little Tim and the Brave Sea Captain (Oxford); its last sequel was Ships Cook Ginger (1977). Tim All Alone was named one of the top ten Medal-winning works in 2007.

1957 V. H. Drummond, Mrs Easter and the Storks (Faber) @ 

1958 (no Medal)

No work was considered suitable, the second and last time.

1959 William Stobbs, Kashtanka (Oxford), by Anton Chekhov (1887)   
and A Bundle of Ballads (Oxford), by Ruth Manning-Sanders from the Child Ballads (19th century collection)
– 	Edward Ardizzone, Titus in Trouble (Bodley Head), by James Reeves
–	Gerald Rose, Wuffles Goes To Town (Faber), by Elizabeth Rose

The 1959 medal recognised two books, the first of four such occasions to 1982. Two runners-up were "Commended", a new distinction that would be used 99 times in 44 years to 2002, including 31 "Highly Commended" books that were named beginning 1974.

1960 Gerald Rose, Old Winkle and the Seagulls (Faber), by Elizabeth Rose 
 (no commendations)

1961 Antony Maitland, Mrs Cockle's Cat (Constable; Longman), by Philippa Pearce 
 (no commendations)

1962 Brian Wildsmith, ABC (Oxford) @
– 	Carol Barker, Achilles the Donkey (Dobson), by H. E. Bates

ABC was Wildsmith's first book, an alphabet book without any words, commissioned by Mabel George at Oxford.

1963 John Burningham, Borka: The Adventures of a Goose With No Feathers (Jonathan Cape) @
–	Victor Ambrus, The Royal Navy (Oxford), by Peter Dawlish
–	Victor Ambrus, A Time of Trial (Oxford), by Hester Burton
– 	Brian Wildsmith, The Lion and the Rat: A Fable (Oxford), by Jean de La Fontaine (1668), from Aesop (6th century BCE)
– 	Brian Wildsmith, Oxford Book of Poetry for Children (Oxford), ed. Edward Blishen

Borka was Burningham's first book as an author or illustrator and it was named one of the top ten Medal-winning works in 2007.

1964 C. Walter Hodges, Shakespeare's Theatre (Oxford) @  —nonfiction
– 	Raymond Briggs, Fee Fi Fo Fum (Hamish Hamilton) @
–	Victor Ambrus, for work in general
–	William Papas, for work in general 

Hodges was a freelance illustrator, a lover of theatre, and an authority on theatre construction in Shakespeare's time. Shakespeare's Theatre was the first nonfiction book cited for the medal.

Ambrus and Papas received the first and only commendations for "work in general".

1965 Victor Ambrus, The Three Poor Tailors (Oxford; Hamish Hamilton) @
 (no commendations)

The Three Poor Tailors was the first-published book written by Ambrus, who had illustrated dozens of fiction and nonfiction books for Oxford since immigrating from Hungary via Austria.

1966 Raymond Briggs, Mother Goose Treasury (Hamish Hamilton), traditional 
– 	Doreen Roberts, The Story of Saul the King (Constable; Oxford), abridged from Helen Waddell, Stories from Holy Writ (1949)

1967 Charles Keeping, Charley, Charlotte and the Golden Canary (Oxford) @
–	William Papas, The Church (Oxford), by Geoffrey Moorhouse
–	William Papas, No Mules (Oxford) @
– 	Brian Wildsmith, Birds (Oxford) @

1968 Pauline Baynes, A Dictionary of Chivalry (Longman), by Grant Uden —reference
–	Gaynor Chapman, The Luck Child: Based on a story of the Brothers Grimm (Hamish Hamilton), based on Brothers Grimm
– 	Shirley Hughes, Flutes and Cymbals: Poetry for the Young (Bodley Head), compiled by Leonard Clark  
–	William Papas, A Letter from India (Oxford) @ —information book
–	William Papas, A Letter from Israel (Oxford) @ —information book 
–	William Papas, Taresh the tea planter (Oxford) @

Baynes alone has won the medal for illustrating a reference book; only a few nonfiction or fictionalised information books have been cited.

The distinguished runners-up (–) were called "Honours" rather than "Commended" for 1968, 1969, and perhaps 1970. 

1969 Helen Oxenbury, The Quangle Wangle's Hat (Heinemann; Franklin Watts), by Edward Lear (late 19th century) 
and The Dragon of an Ordinary Family (Heinemann), by Margaret Mahy 
– 	Errol Le Cain, The Cabbage Princess (Faber) @
–	Charles Keeping, Joseph's Yard (Longman) @

The distinguished runners-up (–) were called "Honours" again.

1970 John Burningham, Mr Gumpy's Outing (Jonathan Cape) @
– 	Charles Keeping, The God Beneath the Sea (Longman), by Leon Garfield and Edward Blishen  
–	Jan Pieńkowski, The Golden Bird (J. M. Dent), by Edith Brill
–	Krystyna Turska, Pegasus (Hamish Hamilton), the myth of Pegasus and Bellerophon retold by Turska

Burningham became the first to win two medals, 1963 and 1970, one year after his wife Helen Oxenbury won her first of two. As of 2012 fourteen illustrators have won two Greenaways, none three.

Garfield and Blishen won the companion Carnegie Medal for The God Beneath the Sea. (For more than fifty years until 2012, no single book won both of the CILIP awards.)

1971 Jan Pieńkowski, The Kingdom under the Sea and other stories (Jonathan Cape), retold by Joan Aiken 
– 	Victor Ambrus, The Sultan's Bath (Oxford) @
–	Brian Wildsmith, The Owl and the Woodpecker (Oxford) @

(One source calls these two runners-up "Highly Commended". They would be the first.)

1972 Krystyna Turska, The Woodcutter's Duck (Hamish Hamilton) @
– 	Carol Barker, King Midas and the Golden Touch (Franklin Watts), a version of the Midas myth
–	Pauline Baynes, Snail and Caterpillar (Longman), by Helen Piers
–	Antony Maitland, The Ghost Downstairs (Longman), by Leon Garfield

1973 Raymond Briggs, Father Christmas (Hamish Hamilton) @
– 	Fiona French, King Tree (Oxford) @
–	Errol Lloyd, My Brother Sean (Bodley Head), by Petronella Breinburg

Briggs introduced the grumpy old man with a challenging, lonely job, to be continued in Father Christmas Goes on Holiday. Father Christmas was named one of the top ten Medal-winning works in 2007.

1974 Pat Hutchins, The Wind Blew (Bodley Head) @ 
– 	Mitsumasa Anno, Anno's Alphabet (Bodley Head) @ 
+ 	Charles Keeping, Railway Passage (Oxford)  @

The Wind Blew has been called informative, meteorological poetry.

(According to answers.com citing Gale Biographies, Anno's Alphabet was ineligible for the medal, with its Japanese author and original publisher.)

1975 Victor Ambrus, Horses in Battle (Oxford) @ 
and Mishka (Oxford) @
–	Shirley Hughes, Helpers (Bodley Head) @ 
– 	Errol Le Cain, Thorn Rose, or the Sleeping Beauty (Faber), from Brothers Grimm

Ambrus won his second medal. Horses in Battle, nonfiction or fictionalised history, is the latest "information book" to be cited except for one, Pirate Diary (2001).

1976 Gail E. Haley, The Post Office Cat (Bodley Head) @
+ 	Graham Oakley, The Church Mice Adrift (Macmillan) @ —fifth of 12 Church Mice books
+	Maureen Roffey, Tinker, Tailor, Soldier, Sailor (Bodley Head), by Bernard Lodge  
+	Joanna Troughton, How the Birds Changed Their Feathers (Blackie, Folk Tales of the World), retold and illustrated by Troughton @ 

Haley had won the 1971 Caldecott Medal (U.S.) and moved to the U.K. in 1973. No one else has won both medals, which CILIP rules and co-publication enable in the 21st century.

1977 Shirley Hughes, Dogger (Bodley Head) @
– 	Janet Ahlberg, Burglar Bill (Heinemann), by Allan Ahlberg
–	Mary Rayner, Garth Pig and the Ice Cream Lady (Macmillan) @

Dogger was named one of the top ten Medal-winning works in 2007, and was voted the public favourite from that slate.

1978 Janet Ahlberg, Each Peach Pear Plum (Kestrel), by Allan Ahlberg 
+ 	Raymond Briggs, The Snowman (Hamish Hamilton) @ —no text
– 	Michael Foreman, Popular Folk Tales (Gollancz), newly translated from Brothers Grimm by Brian Alderson
–	Errol Le Cain, The Twelve Dancing Princesses (Faber), retold from Brothers Grimm by Le Cain

Each Peach Pear Plum was named one of the top ten Medal-winning works in 2007, and finished a close second in public voting on that slate.

1979 Jan Pieńkowski, The Haunted House (Heinemann) @
+ 	Quentin Blake, The Wild Washerwomen: A new folk tale, by John Yeoman
– 	Pat Hutchins, One-Eyed Jack @

Pieńkowski won his second medal.

1980 Quentin Blake, Mr Magnolia (Jonathan Cape) @
– 	Beryl Cook, Seven Years and a Day (Collins), by Colette O'Hare
+ 	Michael Foreman, City of Gold and other stories from the Old Testament (Gollancz), retold by Peter Dickinson  
–	Jill Murphy, Peace at Last @

Mister Magnolia was named one of the top ten Medal-winning works in 2007.

Dickinson won the companion Carnegie Medal for City of Gold. (For more than fifty years until 2012, no single book won both of the CILIP awards.)

1981 Charles Keeping, The Highwayman (Oxford), an edition of the 1906 poem by Alfred Noyes 
– 	Nicola Bayley, The Patchwork Cat (Jonathan Cape), by William Mayne
+ 	Jan Ormerod, Sunshine (Kestrel) @

Keeping won his second medal. The Highwayman was named one of the top ten Medal-winning works in 2007.

1982 Michael Foreman, Long Neck and Thunder Foot (Kestrel), by Helen Piers 
and Sleeping Beauty and other favourite fairy tales (Gollancz), selected and translated by Angela Carter 
– 	Janet Ahlberg, The Baby's Catalogue, by Allan Ahlberg
+ 	Graham Oakley, The Church Mice in Action (Macmillan) @ —eighth of twelve Church Mice books

The 1982 medal recognised two books, the last of four times from 1959. Sleeping Beauty also won the inaugural Kurt Maschler Award for children's book "text and illustration ... integrated so that each enhances and balances the other."

Oakley and the Church Mice were highly commended for the second time, the first double recognition for a series (books five and eight). Subsequently, Janet Ahlberg (Jolly Postman series) and Chris Riddell (Diary series) were runners-up for the first books and medalists for the sequels.

1983 Anthony Browne, Gorilla (Julia MacRae) @
– 	Molly Bang, Ten, Nine, Eight @ —a counting book
–	Michael Foreman, The Saga of Erik the Viking (Pavilion), by Terry Jones  
–	Ron Maris, My Book (Julia MacRae) @

Gorilla was named one of the top ten Medal-winning works in 2007. It also won the annual Kurt Maschler Award for integrated text and illustration.

Ten, Nine, Eight was also a runner-up for the U.S. Caldecott Medal ("Honour Book").

1984 Errol Le Cain, Hiawatha's Childhood (Faber), a section of the 1855 poem by Longfellow
 (no commendations)

1985 Juan Wijngaard, Sir Gawain and the Loathly Lady (Walker), retold by Selina Hastings 
–	Michael Foreman, Seasons of Splendour: Tales, myths, and legends of India (Pavilion), by Madhur Jaffrey  
– 	Gillian McClure, Tog the Ribber, or, Granny's Tale (Andre Deutsch), poem by Paul Coltman  

1986 Fiona French, Snow White in New York (Oxford) @
– 	Janet Ahlberg, The Jolly Postman, by Allan Ahlberg
–	Paddy Bouma, Are We Nearly There? (Bodley Head), by Louis Baum  
–	Babette Cole, Princess Smartypants @
+ 	Jan Ormerod, Happy Christmas, Gemma (Walker), by Sarah Hayes
–	Fiona Pragoff, How Many?: From 0 to 20 (Gollancz) @
–	Tony Ross, I Want My Potty @ —the first Little Princess book

The Ahlbergs won the Emils for The Jolly Postman (Kurt Maschler Award).

1987 Adrienne Kennaway, Crafty Chameleon (Hodder & Stoughton), by Mwenye Hadithi 
– 	Babette Cole, Prince Cinders @
–	Errol Le Cain, The Enchanter's Daughter (Jonathan Cape), by Antonia Barber
–	Jill Murphy, All in One Piece @

1988 Barbara Firth, Can't You Sleep Little Bear? (Walker), by Martin Waddell 
–	Ruth Brown, Ladybird, Ladybird (Andersen), a traditional rhyme
+ 	Anthony Browne, Alice's Adventures in Wonderland, an edition of the 1865 classic by Lewis Carroll
– 	Penny Dale, Wake Up Mr. B! (Walker) @
+	Roberto Innocenti, The Adventures of Pinocchio (Creative Education), an edition of the 1883 classic by Carlo Collodi
+	Alan Lee, Merlin Dreams, by Peter Dickinson

Browne won the Emil for this edition of Alice (Kurt Maschler Award).

Special 1988 commendation: David Burnie, Bird (London: Dorling Kindersley, in association with the National History Museum)

1989 Michael Foreman, War Boy: a Country Childhood (Pavilion) @ —autobiographical
+ 	Helen Oxenbury, We're Going on a Bear Hunt (Walker), retold by Michael Rosen

Foreman won his second medal. Oxenbury was highly commended for the first of four times.

1990 Gary Blythe, The Whales' Song (Hutchinson), by Dyan Sheldon 
– 	Nicola Bayley, The Mousehole Cat (Walker), by Antonia Barber
–	Roberto Innocenti, A Christmas Carol (Creative Education), an edition of the 1843 classic by Charles Dickens
+ 	Tony Ross, Dr Xargle's Book of Earth Tiggers, by Jeanne Willis

1991 Janet Ahlberg, The Jolly Christmas Postman (Heinemann), by Allan Ahlberg 
–  	Caroline Binch, Amazing Grace (Dial), by Mary Hoffman
+ 	Helen Oxenbury, Farmer Duck (Walker), by Martin Waddell

Ahlberg won her second medal, both for husband-and-wife collaborations. The Jolly Christmas Postman was the second of three interactive Jolly Postman books; the last would be published posthumously. Janet Ahlberg is one of three people to be commended for the Greenaway Medal, at least, for two books in a series.

1992 Anthony Browne, Zoo (Julia MacRae) @
+ 	Jill Barton, The Pig in the Pond (Walker), by Martin Waddell
+	Caroline Binch, Hue Boy (Dial), by Rita Phillips Mitchell

Browne won his second medal.

1993 Alan Lee, Black Ships Before Troy (Frances Lincoln), by Rosemary Sutcliff 
– 	Michael Foreman, War Game (Pavilion) @ 
+ 	Helen Oxenbury, The Three Little Wolves and the Big Bad Pig, by Eugene Trivizas

Foreman was a distinguished runner-up for the fifth time (once highly commended).

1994 Gregory Rogers, Way Home (Andersen), by Libby Hathorn 
+ 	Helen Oxenbury, So Much (Walker), by Trish Cooke
–  	Chris Riddell, Something Else (Puffin), by Kathryn Cave

Oxenbury was the lone "Highly Commended" runner-up for the fourth time in six years. The distinction would be used 31 times in 29 years to 2002. Cooke and Oxenbury won the Emils for So Much (Kurt Maschler Award).

1995 to 2002
Through 2002 some runners-up were Commended, including some Highly Commended. Where the entire shortlist is given here (back to 1995), boldface marks the winner, plus (+) marks the highly commended books, and dash (–) marks the commended books.

1995
 # P. J. Lynch, The Christmas Miracle of Jonathan Toomey (Walker Books), by Susan Wojciechowski
 + Patrick Benson, The Little Boat (Walker), by Kathy Henderson
 – Quentin Blake, Clown (Jonathan Cape) @
    Christina Balit, Blodin the Beast (Frances Lincoln), by Michael Morpurgo
    Ken Brown, Tattybogle (Andersen), by Sandra Horn
    Mick Inkpen, Nothing  (Hodder) @
    Colin McNaughton, Here Come the Aliens (Walker) @

Henderson and Benson won the Emils for The Little Boat (Kurt Maschler Award).

1996
– Christina Balit, Ishtar and Tammuz: A Babylonian myth of the seasons (Frances Lincoln), retold by Christopher Moore
+ Caroline Binch, Down by the River (Heinemann), by Grace Hallworth
 Ruth Brown, The Tale of the Monstrous Toad (Andersen) @ 
 Helen Cooper, The Baby Who Wouldn't Go To Bed (Doubleday) @
 Susan Field, The Smallest Whale (Orchard), by Elisabeth Beresford  
 Debi Gliori, Mr Bear to the Rescue (Orchard) @
 Colin McNaughton, Oops! (Andersen) @
 Korky Paul, The Duck That Had No Luck (Bodley Head), by Jonathan Long

1997
 Ken Brown, Mucky Pup (Andersen) @ 
 Anthony Browne, Willy the Dreamer (Walker) @
 Peter Collington, A Small Miracle (Jonathan Cape) @ —no text
+ Bob Graham, Queenie the Bantam (Walker) @
 P. J. Lynch, When Jessie Came Across the Sea (Walker), by Amy Hest  
 Clare Mackie, Book of Nonsense (Macdonald Young Books), by Michael Rosen
+ Charlotte Voake, Ginger (Walker) @
 Sophie Windham, Unicorns! Unicorns! (Hutchinson), by Geraldine McCaughrean

Lynch won his second medal.

1998
 Christian Birmingham, The Lion, the Witch and the Wardrobe (HarperCollins), an edition of the 1950 classic by C. S. Lewis
 Quentin Blake, Zagazoo (Jonathan Cape) @
 Anthony Browne, Voices in the Park (Doubleday) @
 Emma Chichester Clark, I Love You, Blue Kangaroo (Andersen) @
 Helen Cooper, Pumpkin Soup (Doubleday) @
+ Shirley Hughes, The Lion and the Unicorn (Bodley Head) @ 
+ Jane Simmons, Come on Daisy! (Orchard) @

Cooper won her second medal.

1999
This shortlist is incomplete, only the Medalist and Highly Commended (+) or Commended (–) works. The list was completed according to The Guardian webpage. 
 Patrick Benson, The Sea-Thing Child (Walker Books)
 Christian Birmingham, Wombat Goes Walkabout (Harper Collins) 
 Helen Oxenbury, Alice's Adventures in Wonderland (Walker), an edition of the 1865 classic by Lewis Carroll
+ Lauren Child, Clarice Bean, That's Me! (Orchard) @ —Clarice Bean series
+ Chris Riddell, Castle Diary: The Journal of Tobias Burgess, Page (Walker), "transcribed by Richard Platt, illuminated" by Chris Riddell"  
– Kevin Hawkes, Weslandia (Walker Books), by Paul Fleischman
Kathy Henderson, The Storm (Walker Books)
Simon James, Days Like This (Walker Books)

Oxenbury won her second Greenaway Medal. Alice in Wonderland was named one of the top ten Medal-winning works in 2007. She also won her second Emil (Kurt Maschler Award), which was then discontinued (1982 to 1999).

2000
The shortlist and winners for 2000 were as follows.
 Ruth Brown, Snail Trail @
 + Anthony Browne, Willy's Pictures @
 Lauren Child, Beware of the Storybook Wolves @
 Lauren Child, I Will Never Not Ever Eat a Tomato (Orchard Books) @
 – Ted Dewan, Crispin: The Pig Who Had It All (Transworld) @
 Jane Ray, Fairy Tales (Walker), by Berlie Doherty

I will not was named one of the top ten Medal-winning works in 2007, and ranked third in public voting from that slate.

2001
The shortlist and winners for 2001 were as follows.
 + Jez Alborough, Fix-it Duck (Picture Lions) @
 Russell Ayto, The Witch's Children (Orchard Books), by Ursula Jones
 Nicola Bayley, Katje the Windmill Cat (Walker), by Gretchen Woelfle 
 Caroline Binch, Silver Shoes (Dorling Kindersley) @
 Helen Cooper, Tatty Ratty (Doubleday) @
 + Charles Fuge, Sometimes I Like to Curl Up in a Ball (Gullane), by Vicki Churchill
 Bob Graham Let's Get a Pup! (Walker) @
 Chris Riddell, Pirate Diary: The Journal of Jake Carpenter (Walker), by Richard Platt

Pirate Diary is the latest "information book" to be cited for the medal and the first since 1975. It was the second in a series of four first-person journals, inaugurated by Platt and Riddell in 1999 (Castle Diary) and continued by Platt with another illustrator. Riddell is the third and latest illustrator to be at least commended for the Greenaway for books in a series, following Graham Oakley (Church Mice, 1976 and 1982) and Janet Ahlberg (Jolly Postman, 1986 and 1991).

2002
The shortlist and winners for 2002 were as follows.
 Simon Bartram, Man on the Moon (Templar) @
 Nick Butterworth, Albert le Blanc (Collins) @
 – Lauren Child, That Pesky Rat (Orchard Books) @
 Lauren Child, Who's Afraid of the Big Bad Book? (Hodder) @
 Bob Graham, Jethro Byrde, Fairy Child (Walker) @
 David Melling, The Kiss That Missed (Hodder) @
 Nick Sharratt, Pants (David Fickling Books), by Giles Andrae
 Helen Ward, The Cockerel and the Fox (Templar) @ —a retelling of Chanticleer

Graham was the first winning illustrator from Australia. Child was the last "Commended" (–) or "Highly Commended" runner-up; there were 99 distinctions of both kinds in 44 years.

2003 to date
From 2003 there are usually eight books on the Greenaway shortlist. Commendations are no longer given.

2003
The shortlist and winner for 2003 were as follows.
 Anthony Browne, The Shape Game (Doubleday) @
 Alexis Deacon, Beegu (Hutchinson) @
 Debi Gliori, Always and Forever (Doubleday), by Alan Durant
 Mini Grey, The Pea and the Princess (Red Fox) @ —a retelling of "The Princess and the Pea"
 Shirley Hughes, Ella's Big Chance (Bodley Head) @ —a retelling of Cinderella 
 Dave McKean, The Wolves in the Walls (Bloomsbury), by Neil Gaiman
 Bee Willey, Bob Robber and Dancing Jane (Jonathan Cape), by Andrew Matthews
 Chris Wormell, Two Frogs (Red Fox; Jonathan Cape) @

Hughes won her second medal.

2004
The shortlist and winner for 2004 were as follows.
 Ian Andrew, The Boat (Templar), by Helen Ward
 Russell Ayto, One More Sheep (Hodder), by Mij Kelly
 Simon Bartram, Dougal's Deep-Sea Diary (Templar) @
 Quentin Blake, Michael Rosen's Sad Book (Walker Books), by Michael Rosen
 Nick Butterworth, The Whisperer (HarperCollins) @
 John Kelly, Guess Who's Coming For Dinner? (Templar), by Cathy Tincknell
 Chris Riddell, Jonathan Swift's "Gulliver" (Walker Books), the 1726 classic Gulliver's Travels adapted by Martin Jenkins

Riddell won his second medal.

2005
The shortlist and winner for 2005 were as follows.
 Tony DiTerlizzi, Arthur Spiderwick's Field Guide to the Fantastical World Around You (Simon & Schuster), by Holly Black
 Emily Gravett, Wolves (Pan Macmillan) @ 
 Mini Grey, Traction Man Is Here (Red Fox) @
 Oliver Jeffers, Lost and Found (HarperCollins) @
 Dave McKean, Mirrormask (Bloomsbury), by Neil Gaiman
 Jane Ray, Jinnie Ghost (Frances Lincoln), by Berlie Doherty
 David Roberts, Little Red: A Fizzingly Good Yarn (Abrams Books), by Lynn Roberts 
 Rob Scotton, Russell the Sheep (HarperCollins) @

Wolves by Emily Gravett in its U.S. edition was Gravett's first book as author or illustrator, one year out of school. She won the 49th Greenaway Medal, awarded in the 51st year, called fifty for the anniversary celebration in 2007.

Year of presentation after 2006.

2007
The shortlist and winner for 2007 were as follows.
 Ross Collins, The Elephantom (Templar) @
 Emily Gravett, Orange Pear Apple Bear (Pan Macmillan) @ — four words only
 Mini Grey, The Adventures of the Dish and the Spoon (Jonathan Cape) @
 John Kelly and Cathy Tincknell, Scoop! An Exclusive by Monty Molenski (Templar) @@
 Catherine Rayner, Augustus and His Smile (Little Tiger) @
 Chris Riddell, The Emperor of Absurdia (Pan Macmillan) @

2008
The shortlist and winner for 2008 were as follows.
 Anthony Browne, Silly Billy (Walker Books) @
 Polly Dunbar, Penguin (Walker Books) @
 Emily Gravett, Little Mouse's Big Book of Fears (Pan Macmillan) @
 Emily Gravett, Monkey and Me (Pan Macmillan) @
 Jane Ray, The Lost Happy Endings (Bloomsbury), by Carol Ann Duffy
 Chris Riddell, Ottoline and the Yellow Cat (Pan Macmillan) @
 Ed Vere, Banana! (Puffin Books) @

Gravett won her second medal for her fourth book, with cover title Little Mouse's Emily Gravett's Big Book of Fears.

2009
The shortlist and winner for 2009 were as follows.
 Angela Barrett, The Snow Goose (Hutchinson), an edition of the 1941 novella by Paul Gallico
 Marc Craste, Varmints (Templar), by Helen Ward
 Thomas Docherty, Little Boat (Templar) @
 Bob Graham, How to Heal a Broken Wing (Walker Books) @
 Oliver Jeffers, The Way Back Home (HarperCollins) @
 Dave McKean, The Savage (Walker Books), by David Almond
 Catherine Rayner, Harris Finds His Feet (Little Tiger) @
 Chris Wormell, Molly and the Night Monster (Jonathan Cape) @

2010
The shortlist and winner for 2010 were as follows.
 Grahame Baker-Smith, Leon and the Place Between (Templar), by Angela McAllister
 Freya Blackwood, Harry and Hopper (Scholastic), by Margaret Wild
 Oliver Jeffers, The Great Paper Caper (HarperCollins) @
 Satoshi Kitamura, Millie's Marvellous Hat (Andersen) @
 Dave McKean, Crazy Hair (Bloomsbury), by Neil Gaiman
 Chris Riddell, The Graveyard Book (Bloomsbury), by Neil Gaiman
 David Roberts, The Dunderheads (Walker Books), by Paul Fleischman
 Viviane Schwarz, There Are Cats in This Book (Walker Books) @

2011
The shortlist and winner for 2011 were as follows.
 Grahame Baker-Smith, FArTHER (Templar) @
 Anthony Browne, Me and You (Doubleday) @
 Bob Graham, April Underhill Tooth Fairy (Walker Books) @
 Mini Grey, Jim (Jonathan Cape), by Hilaire Belloc, 1907
 Oliver Jeffers, The Heart and the Bottle (HarperCollins) @
 Kristin Oftedal, Big Bear, Little Brother (Pan Macmillan), by Carl Norac
 Catherine Rayner, Ernest (Pan Macmillan) @
 Juan Wijngaard, Cloud Tea Monkeys (Walker Books), by Mal Peet and Elspeth Graham

2012
The shortlist and winner for 2012 were as follows.
 Emily Gravett, Wolf Won't Bite! (Pan Macmillan) @
 Petr Horáček, Puffin Peter (Walker Books) @
 Jim Kay, A Monster Calls (Walker Books), by Patrick Ness
 Dave McKean, Slog's Dad (Walker Books), by David Almond
 Catherine Rayner, Solomon Crocodile (Pan Macmillan) @
 Rob Ryan, The Gift (Barefoot Books), by Carol Ann Duffy
 Viviane Schwarz, There Are No Cats in This Book (Walker Books) @
 Vicky White, Can We Save the Tiger? (Walker Books), by Martin Jenkins —nonfiction

Kay and Ness won both the Greenaway and Carnegie Medals for A Monster Calls, the first such double. Two illustrators of Carnegie Medal-winning books had been runners-up for the Greenaway, Charles Keeping (The God Beneath the Sea, 1970) and Michael Foreman (City of Gold, 1980).

2013
The shortlist and winner for 2013 were as follows.
 Rebecca Cobb, Lunchtime (Pan Macmillan)
 Emily Gravett, Again! (Pan Macmillan)
 Chris Haughton, Oh No, George! (Walker Books)
 Jon Klassen, I Want My Hat Back (Walker Books)
 Chris Mould, Pirates 'n' Pistols (Hodder)
 Helen Oxenbury, King Jack and the Dragon (Puffin Books), by Peter Bently 
 Levi Pinfold, Black Dog (Templar)
 Salvatore Rubbino, Just Ducks! (Walker Books), by Nicola Davies

2014
The shortlist and winner for 2014 were as follows.
 Rebecca Cobb, The Paper Dolls (Pan Macmillan), by Julia Donaldson 
 Olivia Gill, Where My Wellies Take Me (Templar), by Michael Morpurgo and Clare Morpurgo 
 Oliver Jeffers, The Day the Crayons Quit (HarperCollins), by Drew Daywalt
 Jon Klassen, This Is Not My Hat (Walker Books)
 Jon Klassen, The Dark (Orchard Books), by Lemony Snicket
 Dave McKean, Mouse Bird Snake Wolf (Walker Books), by David Almond
 Birgitta Sif, Oliver (Walker Books)

Klassen, a Canadian, won the 2013 Caldecott Medal for This Is Not My Hat, recognising the previous year's "most distinguished American picture book for children". This marks the first time that the same book has won both the Greenaway and Caldecott medals and Klassen is the first Greenaway winner from Canada.

2015
The shortlist and winner for 2015 were as follows.
 Laura Carlin, The Promise (Walker Books), by Nicola Davies
 Alexis Deacon, Jim's Lion (Walker Books), by Russell Hoban
 William Grill, Shackleton's Journey (Flying Eye Books)
 John Higgins and Marc Olivent, Dark Satanic Mills (Walker Books), by Marcus Sedgwick and Julian Sedgwick
 Catherine Rayner, Smelly Louie (Pan Macmillan)
 Chris Riddell, Goth Girl and the Ghost of a Mouse (Pan Macmillan)
 David Roberts, Tinder (Orion Books), by Sally Gardner
 Shaun Tan, Rules of Summer (Lothian Publishing)

2016
The shortlist and winner for 2016 were as follows.
 Anthony Browne, Willy's Stories (Walker Books)
 Ross Collins, There's a Bear on My Chair (Nosy Crow)
 Oliver Jeffers, Once Upon an Alphabet (HarperCollins)
 Jon Klassen, Sam & Dave Dig a Hole (Walker Books), by Mac Barnett
 Jackie Morris, Something About a Bear (Frances Lincoln)
 Helen Oxenbury, Captain Jack and the Pirates (Puffin Books), by Peter Bently
 Chris Riddell, The Sleeper and the Spindle (Bloomsbury), by Neil Gaiman
 Sydney Smith, Footpath Flowers (Walker Books), by JonArno Lawson

Chris Riddell became the first triple winner in the history of the award, having previously won in 2001 and 2004.

2017
The shortlist and winner for 2017 were as follows.
 Dieter Braun, Wild Animals of the North (Flying Eye Books)
 Emily Gravett, Tidy (Two Hoots)
 William Grill, The Wolves of Currumpaw (Flying Eye Books)
 Jim Kay, Harry Potter and the Philosopher's Stone (Bloomsbury), by J. K. Rowling
 Chris Riddell, A Great Big Cuddle (Walker Books), by Michael Rosen 
 Francesca Sanna, The Journey (Flying Eye Books)
 Brian Selznick, The Marvels (Scholastic)
 Lane Smith, There Is a Tribe of Kids (Two Hoots)

2018
The shortlist and winner for 2018 were as follows.
 Laura Carlin, King of the Sky (Walker Books), by Nicola Davies
 Debi Gliori, Night Shift (Hot Key Books)
 Petr Horáček, A First Book of Animals (Walker Books), by Nicola Davies
 Levi Pinfold, The Song from Somewhere Else (Bloomsbury), by A.F. Harrold
 Sydney Smith, Town Is by the Sea (Walker Books), by Joanne Schwartz
 Pam Smy, Thornhill (David Fickling Books)
 Britta Teckentrup, Under the Same Sky (Little Tiger)

2019
The shortlist and winner for 2019 were as follows.
 Jon Klassen, The Wolf, the Duck and the Mouse (Walker Books), by Mac Barnett
 Rebecca Cobb, The Day War Came (Walker Books), by Nicola Davies
 Eric Fan and Terry Fan, Ocean Meets Sky (Frances Lincoln)
 Maria Gulemetova, Beyond the Fence (Child's Play)
 Jessica Love, Julian is a Mermaid (Walker Books)
 Poonam Mistry, You're Safe With Me (Lantana Publishing), by Chitra Soundar
 Jackie Morris, The Lost Words (Hamish Hamilton), by Robert Macfarlane
 David Roberts, Suffragette: The Battle for Equality (Two Hoots)

2020
The shortlist and winner for 2020 were as follows.
 Poonam Mistry, You're Snug with Me (Lantana Publishing), by Chitra Soundar
 Chris Mould, The Iron Man (Faber & Faber), by Ted Hughes
 Chris Naylor-Ballesteros, The Suitcase (Nosy Crow)
 Kadir Nelson, The Undefeated (Andersen Press), by Kwame Alexander
 Levi Pinfold, The Dam (Walker Books), by David Almond
 Júlia Sardà, Mary and Frankenstein (Andersen Press), by Linda Bailey
 Shaun Tan, Tales from the Inner City (Walker Books)
 Beth Waters, Child of St Kilda (Child's Play)

2021
The shortlist and winner for 2021 were as follows.
 Sharon King-Chai, Starbird (Two Hoots)
 Sara Lundberg, The Bird Within Me, translated by B J Epstein (Book Island)
 Kate Milner, It's A No-Money Day (Barrington Stoke)
 Poonam Mistry, How The Stars Came To Be (Tate Publishing)
 Pete Oswald, Hike (Walker Books)
 David Ouimet, I Go Quiet (Canongate)
 Catherine Rayner, Arlo The Lion Who Couldn't Sleep (Pan Macmillan)
 Sydney Smith, Small In The City (Walker Books)

2022
The shortlist and winner for 2022 were as follows.

 George Butler, Drawn Across Borders (Walker Books)
 Mariachiara Di Giorgio, The Midnight Fair (Walker Books)
 Emily Gravett, Too Much Stuff (Pan Macmillan)
 Danica Novgorodoff, Long Way Down (Faber)
 Christian Robinson, Milo Imagines the World (Pan Macmillan)
 Yu Rong, Shu Lin's Grandpa (Otter-Barry Books)
 Sydney Smith, I Talk Like a River (Walker Books)
 Peter Van den Ende, The Wanderer (Pushkin Children's Books)

See also

 Carnegie Medal
 Kurt Maschler Award (the Emil)
 Mother Goose Award
 Caldecott Medal – the premier American Library Association award for picture book illustration
 Comics Literacy Awareness

Notes

References

Citations

External links
 Kate Greenaway Medal at loveTheBook

  
Awards established in 1955
1955 establishments in the United Kingdom
British literary awards